Nazan is a Turkish feminine given name and may refer to:

 Nazan Akın (born 1983), Turkish Paralympic judoka
 Nazan Bekiroğlu (born 1957), Turkish novelist
 Nazan Bulut (born 1973), Turkish women's footballer and teacher
 Nazan Eckes (born 1976), Turkish-German television personality
 Nazan Kesal (born 1957), Turkish actress
 Nazan Maksudyan (born 1977), historian and academic
 Nazan Öncel (born 1956), Turkish singer
 Nazan Saatci (born 1958), Turkish actress and writer
 Nazan Şoray (born 1954), Turkish singer and actress

Turkish feminine given names